This is a list of video games published or developed by Electronic Arts. Since 1983 and the 1987 release of its Skate or Die!, it has respectively published and developed games, bundles, as well as a handful of earlier productivity software. Only versions of games developed or published by EA, as well as those versions' years of release, are listed.

Sections  
 List of Electronic Arts games: 1983–1999
 List of Electronic Arts games: 2000–2009
 List of Electronic Arts games: 2010–2019
 List of Electronic Arts games: 2020–present

Franchises

References

External links 
 Official portal of EA Games
 List of Electronic Arts games from MobyGames

 
Electronic Arts